Janko Mihailović Moler (in Cyrillic Serbian: Јанко Михаиловић Молер; Negrišori, Ottoman Empire, 1792 - Negrišori, Principality of Serbia, 1853) was a Serbian priest and artist. He was an icon and portrait painter.

Biography
He is known for painting the icons of the iconostasis of the Serbian Orthodox Church in Ježevica Monastery, the Orthodox church in Guča, the church of Žiča monastery, the monastery and the wooden church of Dobroselica, on the Zlatibor mountains.
With his son Sreten Protić, he painted the iconostasis of the Church of the Holy Trinity in the village of Bjeluša, near Arilje, in 1831, and the Church of St. John the Baptist in Gorobilje.
He also did the portrait of Nikifor Maksimović, the founder of the Sretenje monastery near Čačak.

He is also credited with the coat of arms of the Obrenović dynasty, which adorns the façade of Jovan Obrenović's konak in Čačak.

See also
 List of painters from Serbia
 Serbian art

References 

Serbian clergy
19th-century Serbian painters
Serbian male painters
Portrait painters
1792 births
1853 deaths
People from Lučani
19th-century Serbian male artists